The Minister of Science, Technology and Innovation has been Chang Lih Kang since 3 December 2022. He is deputised by Deputy Minister of Science, Technology and Innovation. The minister administers the portfolio through the Ministry of Science, Technology and Innovation.

List of ministers of technology 
The following individuals have been appointed as Minister of Technology, or any of its precedent titles:

Political Party:

List of ministers of science 
The following individuals have been appointed as Minister of Science, or any of its precedent titles:

Political Party:

List of ministers of innovation 
The following individuals have been appointed as Minister of Innovation, or any of its precedent titles:

Political Party:

List of ministers of research 
The following individuals have been appointed as Minister of Research, or any of its precedent titles:

Political Party:

List of ministers of green technology
The following individuals have been appointed as Minister of Green Technology, or any of its precedent titles:

Political Party:

References

Ministry of Energy, Technology, Science, Climate Change and Environment (Malaysia)
Lists of government ministers of Malaysia
Malaysia